Gypsophila spinosa is a plant species in the genus Gypsophila.

References

spinosa